Moody 4B is an instrumental album released by jazz musician James Moody. The album was released in 2010 on IPO Recordings, Moody's fifth release on the label, and was produced by Michael Patterson, Bill Sorin was executive producer. It won the 2011 Grammy Award for Best Jazz Instrumental Album, Individual or Group.

Overview

Moody 4B was recorded in July 2008 in New York City. Work began one day after completion of Moody's 2009 release Moody 4A. He employed the same musicians for both recordings; pianist Kenny Barron, bassist Todd Coolman, and drummer Lewis Nash with Moody on tenor sax. The album consists of reworks of seven selections from the Great American Songbook and jazz standards plus two originals composed by Barron, "Nikara's Song", and Coolman, "O.P. Update".

In February 2011 Moody 4B won the Grammy Award for Best Jazz Instrumental Album by an Individual or Group. Moody had previously recorded over fifty solo albums and been nominated for several Grammies but the win was his first. The award was given two months after Moody died as a result of pancreatic cancer. The other nominees in the category were Positootly! by John Beasley, The New Song and Dance by The Clayton Brothers, Historicity by the Vijay Iyer Trio, and  Providencia by Danilo Pérez. During the Grammy telecast Moody was featured along with other recently deceased musicians in a tribute montage.

Reception

Michael G. Nastos of Allmusic called Moody 4B a "safe concession to mainstream jazz" and that Mood "has still got it". He called Moody's sax play "polished and graceful" and his sidemen "too good and literate to be denied high accolades".

All About Jazz published three reviews of the album by Warren Allen, Edward Blanco, and Dan Bilawsky. Allen called the album "a healthy dose of good swing by the best in the business". He called the two original numbers "sweet and catchy enough to fit seamlessly into the program" and closes by saying the recording "simply sounds like good jazz should". Blanco closed his review with "At 85 years young, James Moody keeps churning out some of the best straight ahead jazz in the business." Lastly, Bilawsky called the set "a fine edition to the catalog of one of the most enduring and important saxophonists in jazz".

Andrea Canter called the album "a monster quartet outing" in Jazz Police, going on she wrote that "each musician shines although perhaps none more than the leader".

Track listing
"Take the A Train" (Billy Strayhorn) 4:30
"Hot House" (Tadd Dameron) 9:11
"Speak Low" (Kurt Weill, Ogden Nash) 6:27
"Polka Dots & Moonbeams" (Jimmy Van Heusen) 9:50
"I Love You" (Cole Porter) 6:45
"O.P. Update" (Todd Coolman) 5:18
"Nikara's Song" (Kenny Barron) 6:06
"Along Came Betty" (Benny Golson) 6:16
"But Not for Me" (George Gershwin, Ira Gershwin) 6:41

Personnel
James Moody – tenor saxophone
Kenny Barron – piano 
Todd Coolman – bass
Lewis Nash – drums

Production
Michael Patterson – producer
William F. Sorin – A&R, executive producer
Jonathan Rosenberg – engineer, mastering
Ira Gitler – liner notes
Nick Ruechel – photography
MaryJo Schwalbach – watercolor artwork

References

2010 albums
James Moody (saxophonist) albums
Grammy Award for Best Jazz Instrumental Album